The laudatio Iuliae amitae ("Eulogy for Aunt Julia") is a funeral oration that Julius Caesar said in 68 BC to honor his dead aunt Julia, the widow of Marius. The introduction of this laudatio funebris is reproduced in the work Divus Iulius by the Roman historian Suetonius:

See also
 Poetry by Julius Caesar

References

Works by Julius Caesar
Funeral orations
Ancient Roman speeches